is a Japanese footballer currently playing as a defender for Tegevajaro Miyazaki from 2023.

Career
In 2016, Ihara joined to J.FC Miyazaki.

In 12 January 2017, Ihara joined to Tegevajaro Miyazaki.

On 27 December 2021 Ihara joined to J3 club, Kagoshima United from 2022.

On 25 December 2022, Ihara officially return to former club, Tegevajaro Miyazaki for upcoming 2023 season.

Career statistics

Club
.

Notes

References

External links

1991 births
Living people
Japan University of Economics alumni
Japanese footballers
Japanese expatriate footballers
Association football defenders
Japan Football League players
J3 League players
Lao Toyota F.C. players
J.FC Miyazaki players
Tegevajaro Miyazaki players
Kagoshima United FC players
Japanese expatriate sportspeople in Laos
Expatriate footballers in Laos